Frank Braña (born Francisco Braña Pérez; 24 February 1934 – 13 February 2012) was a Spanish character actor.

Biography
He was born Francisco Braña Pérez in Pola de Allande, Asturias, Spain on 24 February 1934. Also credited as Frank Blank, Francisco Brana, Frank Brana, Frank Branya, Francisco Braña and Paco Braña, his career has been mostly based in Spanish and Italian movies of the spaghetti Western, horror and sword-and-sandal genres, having worked in more than 200 productions from the early 1960s, not always as a supporting actor.

He appeared in the Dollars Trilogy by Sergio Leone: Per un pugno di dollari (1964), he played Blackie in Per qualche dollaro in più (1965), and Il buono, il brutto, il cattivo (1966). He appeared in Jessy Does Not Forgive... He Kills! (1965) along Vivien Dodds, Óscar Pellicer and Luis Induni.

He appeared in And the Crows Will Dig Your Grave (1971) and Dallas (1972), by John Wood, Django Does Not Forgive (1967), by Julio Buchs, Django Kill... If You Live, Shoot! (1967), by Giulio Questi, If You Shoot... You Live!, by Javier Elorrieta, and Three Supermen of the West (1974), by Italo Martinenghi. He played Dan Robinson in Kilma, Queen of the Amazons (1976). He played Prince in Perseus Against the Monsters (1963) in a supporting role along Antonio Molino Rojo and Lorenzo Robledo, in Once Upon a Time in the West (1968) along Benito Stefanelli, Antonio Molino Rojo, Fabio Testi and Spartaco Conversi, federal agent Sam Puttnam in Light the Fuse... Sartana Is Coming (1970) along Massimo Serato, Nieves Navarro and José Jaspe, and Battle of the Amazons (1973) along Alberto Dell'Acqua, Benito Stefanelli and his son Marco.

One of his last film was Tiovivo c. 1950 (2004), by José Luis Garci, which received a nomination for Academy Award for Best International Feature Film. On 13 February 2012, 3:15 pm, Brana died from respiratory failure at a hospital in Madrid, Spain, he was 11 days away of his 78th birthday.

Selected filmography

Chinitas's Cafe (1960) – Tipo en palco (uncredited)
Il conquistatore di Maracaibo (1961) – Pirate
King of Kings (1961) – Roman Soldier (uncredited)
Horizontes de luz (1962)
Accidente 703 (1962) – Amigo de Perico (uncredited)
Perseo l'invincibile (1963) – Prince (uncredited)
Han robado una estrella (1963) – Camionero
Los conquistadores del Pacífico (1963)
Rififí en la ciudad (1963) – Mario Alonso (uncredited)
Juego de hombres (1963)
Gibraltar (1964) – Thug
Apache Fury (1964) – Secuaz de Burt
A Fistful of Dollars (1964) – Baxter Gang Member (uncredited)
Brandy (1964) – Driver
I due violenti (1964) – Perkins
La tumba del pistolero (1964) – Jinete negro
Doomed Fort (1964) – John
Los siete bravísimos (1964)
El señor de La Salle (1964) – (uncredited)
El proscrito del río Colorado (1965) – Bandido
Murieta (1965) – Pistolero 1
Jandro (1965) – Roque
 The Last Tomahawk (1965) – Corporal (uncredited)
La frontera de Dios (1965)
Tierra de fuego (1965)
For a Few Dollars More (1965) – Blackie (Indio's Gang) (uncredited)
Adiós gringo (1965) – Ranchester's henchman with red shirt
A Coffin for the Sheriff (1965) – Lupe's Henchman
Due mafiosi contro Al Capone (1966) – Bud Messina
Gunman Called Nebraska (1966) – Dickson
High Season for Spies (1966)
Per il gusto di uccidere (1966) – (uncredited)
Sugar Colt (1966) – Bandit
The Ugly Ones (1966)
The Texican (1966) – U.S. Marshal Vic
The Big Gundown (1966) – Widow's ranchero (uncredited)
The Good, the Bad and the Ugly (1966) – Bounty Hunter #2 (uncredited)
Jugando a morir (1966)
Django Does Not Forgive (1966)
El hombre que mató a Billy el Niño (1967) – Murphy's Henchman (uncredited)
A Witch Without a Broom (1967) – Captain of the Guard
Django Kill... If You Live, Shoot! (1967) – Templer Henchman (uncredited)
Un hombre vino a matar (1967) – Tom
El halcón de Castilla (1967) – Alejandro
God Forgives... I Don't! (1967) – Smoking poker player with moustache
Face to Face (1967) – Jason
15 Scaffolds for a Murderer (1967) – Adam, Sandy's Henchman
Dos hombres van a morir (1968) – Juez
Tutto per tutto (1968) – Posse Sheriff
Lo voglio morto (1968)
Persecución hasta Valencia (1968)
Pistol for a Hundred Coffins (1968) – Joe, Stagecoach Driver
Suicide Commandos (1968) – (uncredited)
El secreto del capitán O'Hara (1968) – Henry
Ace High (1968) – Joe (uncredited)
Once Upon a Time in the West (1968) – Member of Frank's Gang Smoking Pipe at Auction (uncredited)
La muchacha del Nilo (1969) – Terry
La morte sull'alta collina (1969) – Captain Young
Garringo (1969) – Bill
I vigliacchi non pregano (1969) – Rod, Blake Henchman (uncredited)
Johnny Ratón (1969) – Bill
The Price of Power (1969) – Mortimer (uncredited)
I diavoli della guerra (1969) – Peter Kolowsky
Santo frente a la muerte (1969) – Mario
The Avenger, Zorro (1969) – Dominguez (uncredited)
The House That Screamed (1970)
Golpe de mano (Explosión) (1970) – El Fulminante
Che fanno i nostri supermen tra le vergini della jungla? (1970) – Zumakov
Santo contra los asesinos de la mafia (1970)
Manos torpes (1970)
Churchill's Leopards (1970) – François Leduc
Un par de asesinos (1970) – Brian Lester
Il magnifico Robin Hood (1970) – Prince John
El bosque del lobo (1970) – (uncredited)
Cloud of Dust... Cry of Death... Sartana Is Coming (1970) – Deputy Sheriff with Eye Patch
Una chica casi decente (1971) – Luc
And the Crows Will Dig Your Grave (1971) – Glenn Kovac
In nome del padre, del figlio e della Colt (1971) – Judge Finlay
Let's Go and Kill Sartana (1971)
They Call Him Cemetery (1971) – Saloon Patron
The Butcher of Binbrook (1971) – Dr. Lexter
Nicholas and Alexandra (1971) – Gate Guard at Palace (uncredited)
Delusions of Grandeur (1971) – (uncredited)
The Boldest Job in the West (1972) – Jess
Hai sbagliato... dovevi uccidermi subito! (1972) – Sheriff Lewis Burton
Un dólar de recompensa (1972) – Judge
Timanfaya (Amor prohibido) (1972)
Arizona Kid (1972) – Austin Styles
Crimen de amor (1972) – The detective
Campeones del ring (1972)
 Una bala marcada (1972)
La guerrilla (1973)
La redada (1973)
Hannah, Queen of the Vampires (1973) – Abdul Hamid – The Blind Sailor
El secreto de la momia egipcia (1973) – James Barton
Le Amazzoni – Donne d'amore e di guerra (1973)
Oi teleftaioi tou Rupel (1973)
...e così divennero i 3 supermen del West (1973) – Brad
Verflucht dies Amerika (1973) – Guardia mudo
Return of the Blind Dead (1973) – Howard
Fasthand (1973) – Quincy
Santo contra el doctor Muerte (1973) – Henchman
El último viaje (1974) – Sergio
Il mio nome è Scopone e faccio sempre cappotto (1974)
Los fríos senderos del crimen (1974) – Guy Malone
Open Season (1974)
Vacaciones sangrientas (1974)
Las violentas (1974) – Peterson
El último proceso en París (1974) – Taxista
Metralleta 'Stein''' (1975) – El MineroEl clan de los inmorales (1975)Tarzán y el tesoro Kawana (1975) – JackLa última jugada (1975) – RalphLos hijos de Scaramouche (1975) – PierreSi quieres vivir... dispara (1975) – MarcoMuerte de un quinqui (1975) – MartínEl misterio de la perla negra (1976) – JulioKilma, reina de las amazonas (1976) – Dan RobinsonEl alijo (1976) – Guardia civilEl in... moral (1976)Las alimañas (1977) – RalphHitler's Last Train (1977) – Otto KramerWhere Time Began (1977) – Hans BelkerSweetly You'll Die Through Love (1977) – Toife (uncredited)Perros callejeros (1977) – El EsquinaoFantasma en el Oeste (1978)Missile X: The Neutron Bomb Incident (1978) – RigoSupersonic Man (1979) – PetersonSavana violenza carnale (1979)The Cantabrians (1980)Revenge of the Black Wolf (1981) – TeodoroEl lobo negro (1981)Mystery on Monster Island (1981) – BirlingBuitres sobre la ciudad (1981) – Mike HaddonLas muñecas del King Kong (1981)Freddie of the Jungle (1981) – JackLos diablos del mar (1982) – Van HasselPieces (1982) – Sgt. HoldenHundra (1983) – ChieftainThe Pod People (1983) – BurtGoma-2 (1984) – PeioYellow Hair and the Fortress of Gold (1984) – The Sergeant (uncredited)Story of O - Chapter 2 (1984)Guerra sucia (1984) – BrunoTex and the Lord of the Deep (1985) – Mr. Bedford (uncredited)Yo, 'El Vaquilla' (1985) – ManuelLuna de lobos (1987) – ArrieroSiesta (1987) – Park PolicemanLa herencia del mal (1987) – HansSlugs (1988) – Frank PhillipsOro fino (1989)The Rift (1990) – MullerDon Juan, mi querido fantasma (1990) – Celador 5La mansión de los Cthulhu (1990) – FelixSuperagentes en Mallorca (1990)Dyningar (1991) – Gen. AlonsoManoa, la ciudad de oro (1999) – MorganEl escarabajo de oro (1999) – Capitán KiddEl invierno de las anjanas (2000) – ColonelMaestros (2000)Tiovivo c. 1950'' (2004) – Don Luis

References

Bibliography

External links

 Frank Braña filmography
 

1934 births
2012 deaths
20th-century Spanish male actors
21st-century Spanish male actors
Actors from Asturias
Respiratory disease deaths in Spain
Deaths from respiratory failure
Male Spaghetti Western actors
People from Narcea
Spanish male film actors
Spanish male television actors